František Lanák was a Slovak football manager. He coached ŠK Slovan Bratislava.

References

Slovak football managers
Czechoslovak football managers
ŠK Slovan Bratislava managers
Possibly living people
Year of birth missing